Pee Wee Lake is a lake in Inyo County, California, in the United States.

Pee Wee Lake was named for its small size.

See also
 List of lakes in California

References

Lakes of California
Lakes of Inyo County, California
Lakes of Northern California